Danny "Chocolate" Myers (born October 17, 1948) is an American stock car racing personality. A long-time staffer for Richard Childress Racing, he was the fueler on six of the team's NASCAR championships (Dale Earnhardt Sr., 1986–87, 1990–91, 1993–94) and is the current curator of the team's museum. He is a radio host on Sirius Satellite Radio.

Racing career
Chocolate Myers worked as the fueler for Richard Childress Racing's No. 3 and later No. 29 team from 1976 until 2002. He was part of the "Flying Aces" crew that was named the NASCAR pit crew of the year from 1985 until 1988. During the 20 years as an over-the-wall crew member, Chocolate and team owner Richard Childress visited victory lane 84 times, including the 1998 Daytona 500 win with driver Dale Earnhardt, Sr. Chocolate began his own "big time" racing career in 1968. That was the year he and Childress went to the Daytona 500 together the first time.

Earnhardt died in the 2001 Daytona 500 and the images of Myers' emotional outburst three weeks later as the team scored its first win with new driver Kevin Harvick are regarded today as one of NASCAR's most emotional wins. Myers retired at the end of 2002; during the season he was part of the crew that was swapped from servicing Kevin Harvick to Robby Gordon's car.

One of the highlights of Chocolate's career was racing in Japan with his friends Richard Childress and Dale Earnhardt, Sr. in 1996. He also went to sign autographs for the troops in the War in Iraq. Myers is also on the Racers Speaking Circuit.

Racing family
Chocolate Myers is a native of Winston-Salem, North Carolina. He is the eldest son of the NASCAR racer Bobby Myers, who was known as the "Master of the Madhouse" for his racing exploits at the legendary Bowman Gray Stadium. Myers died in an accident at the 1957 Southern 500 while driving for Richard Petty's father Lee Petty.
His mother was Lorene Yountz Myers. 
Every year, NASCAR bestows the prestigious Myers Brothers Award to the person, corporation, or entity that has had the greatest positive impact on the sport of stock car racing that year. The Myers Brothers Award was named for Bobby and Billy Myers, Chocolate's father and uncle. Chocolate is married to Caron Myers, (Caron Pappas Myers) a television/radio broadcaster. Caron Myers has worked as a NASCAR reporter and as a reporter for FOX 8/WGHP television in High Point, NC. Caron has also reported for WFDD, Wake Forest Demon Deacons and WTOB. The couple has an adult daughter Alexi, who is married to Seth Miller and they have a son named Greyson. Chocolate and Caron have homes in Lexington, NC and Ocean Isle Beach, NC. Chocolate Myers remains with RCR as the curator of the RCR Museum in Welcome, NC.

Actor
Myers also co-hosts a radio show, Tradin' Paint, on Sirius Satellite Radio. Chocolate Myers has done color-commentating on ESPN2, appeared in countless television commercials, and acted in movies, including the "Smokey and the Bandit" series. He has also appeared on several episodes of QVC.

Honors
He was inducted into the Legends of NASCAR Hall of Fame in 2006. Chocolate Myers and his wife Caron are featured in a chapter of Peter Golenbock's book "The Last Lap".

Further reading
Interview at Legends of NASCAR

References

Living people
1948 births
Sportspeople from Winston-Salem, North Carolina
NASCAR people